Benjamin Appel (September 13, 1907 – April 3, 1977), was an American novelist specializing in detective and crime fiction, sometimes from a radical perspective.

Appel was born in New York City to Louis Appel and Bessie (née Mikofsky) and grew up in the Hell's Kitchen neighborhood.  It was this experience that he drew upon when writing his novels. He was educated at the University of Pennsylvania and New York University, from 1925–1927, taking a B.S. from Lafayette College in 1929. Before he began earning a living from his writing, he was a bank clerk, farmer, lumberjack, factory-hand and a housing inspector for New York City. Appel married Sophie Marshak in 1936; they had three daughters.

He lived most of his life in Roosevelt, New Jersey, and died there in 1977.

Works 
Maxim Lieber was Appel's literary agent in 1933 and 1935.

 Brain Guy, a.k.a. The Enforcer (1934)
 Four Roads to Death, a.k.a. Gold and Flesh (1935)
 Runaround (1937)
 The Power-House (1939)
 The Dark Stain (1943)
 But Not Yet Slain (1947)
 Fortress in the Rice (1951)
 Hell's Kitchen, a.k.a. Alley Kids (1952)
 Plunder (1952)
 Dock Walloper (1953)
 Sweet Money Girl (1954)
 Life and Death of a Tough Guy, a.k.a. Teen-Age Mobster (1955)
 
 The Raw Edge (1958, with cover photo by David Attie)
 The Funhouse, a.k.a. The Death Master (1959)
 Big Man, A Fast Man (1961)
 A Time of Fortune (1963)
 The Devil and W. Kaspar (1977)
 Brain Guy / Plunder (2005)

References

1907 births
1977 deaths
University of Pennsylvania alumni
New York University alumni
Lafayette College alumni
20th-century American novelists
20th-century American male writers
American crime fiction writers
American male novelists
People from Hell's Kitchen, Manhattan
People from Roosevelt, New Jersey
Writers from Manhattan
Novelists from New York (state)